The High Timber Times was a weekly newspaper (published on Thursdays) that served the Highway 285 Corridor, 20-30 miles southwest of Denver, Colorado. Communities served by the High Timber Times included Conifer, Marshdale, and Bailey. It was published by  Evergreen Newspapers.  

In October 2016, the paper merged with The Canyon Courier.

References

Newspapers published in Colorado
Weekly newspapers published in the United States
Jefferson County, Colorado
1977 establishments in Colorado
Newspapers established in 1977
Publications disestablished in 2016